James Breen (born 23 May 1945) is a former Irish independent politician. He is a former Teachta Dála (TD) for the Clare constituency.

He was a SIPTU shop steward in De Beers in Shannon. Originally a Fianna Fáil councillor he left the party in 2000. Breen was elected to Dáil Éireann at the 2002 general election. He joined the left wing Technical group which was set up to gain Dáil speaking time for independent, Sinn Féin and Socialist Party TDs. Breen narrowly lost his seat to Joe Carey of Fine Gael by 456 votes at the 2007 general election.

At the 2009 local elections he topped the poll in the Ennis West electoral area for Clare County Council. He again stood as an independent candidate at the 2011 general election for the Clare constituency but was again defeated on the last count, this time by Timmy Dooley by 1,501 votes. He retired from politics at the 2019 local elections.

References

External links

1945 births
Living people
Independent TDs
Fianna Fáil politicians
20th-century Irish farmers
Local councillors in County Clare
Members of the 29th Dáil
Politicians from County Clare
Irish trade unionists
21st-century Irish farmers